Nicole Banecki (born 3 September 1988) is a German footballer who plays for Bayer 04 Leverkusen. She made her debut in the German national team on 7 March 2008 against Finland.

Banecki played for Germany at the 2008 FIFA U-20 Women's World Cup finals in Chile.

Honours 
 U-19 European Championship winner  – 2007
 U-20 Women's World Cup third place – 2008

References

External links 
 Profile at Bayern Munich
 
 

1988 births
Living people
German women's footballers
FC Bayern Munich (women) players
FCR 2001 Duisburg players
SC Freiburg (women) players
German expatriate sportspeople in Switzerland
Expatriate women's footballers in Switzerland
Footballers from Berlin
Women's association football forwards
FC Basel Frauen players
Swiss Women's Super League players
Bayer 04 Leverkusen (women) players
Frauen-Bundesliga players
Germany women's international footballers